Bishop of (the) East(ern) (Region) may refer to:

 Bishop of the Eastern Region, an assistant bishop in the Anglican Diocese of Melbourne
 Bishop of the Eastern and Rural Region, an assistant bishop in the Anglican Diocese of Perth